Netzer Sereni is a kibbutz in central Israel. Located in the Shephelah between Be'er Ya'akov and Ness Ziona, it falls under the jurisdiction of Gezer Regional Council.

History

Kibbutz Netzer Sereni was founded in 1948 by Holocaust survivors liberated from Buchenwald concentration camp, who had established themselves in 1945 as the "Kibbutz Buchenwald", an agricultural collective designed to prepare Jews for life in Palestine - the first such Hakhshara group established in Germany after the war. The kibbutz  was established on the land of the  depopulated Palestinian  village named Bir Salim. The name was changed later to Netzer by the Buchenwald members. The kibbutz was named Netzer Sereni after Enzo Sereni, a Jewish Italian intellectual, Zionist leader and Jewish Brigade officer. Sereni was one of the founders of Givat Brenner. He was parachuted into Nazi-occupied Italy in World War II, only to be immediately captured by the Germans and executed in Dachau concentration camp; in Hebrew netzer means sprout, shoot or branch. 

In 1948–1951 a national political separation between the two labour parties, Mapam and Mapai, led to a split within the kibbutz movement. In 1952, 120 Mapai members of Kibbutz Givat Brenner broke away for ideological reasons and moved to Netzer Sereni.

Notable people

 Eyal Ben-Reuven

References

Kibbutzim
Kibbutz Movement
Populated places established in 1948
Populated places in Central District (Israel)
1948 establishments in Israel
German-Jewish culture in Israel